Mediouna is a town and municipality in Médiouna Province of the Casablanca-Settat region of Morocco. At the time of the 2004 census, the commune had a total population of 14,712 people living in 2,958 households.

References

Populated places in Médiouna Province
Municipalities of Morocco
Mediouna, Morocco